Technetium trichloride is an inorganic compound of technetium and chlorine with the formula TcCl3.

Preparation and properties 
Two polymorphs of technetium trichloride are known. The α-polymorph is prepared as a black solid from ditechnetium(III) tetraacetate dichloride and hydrogen chloride at 300 °C. It has a bioctahedral structure, consisting of triangular Tc3Cl9 units with C3v symmetry, with each Tc atom coordinated to two Tc neighbors and five chloride ligands (Tc-Tc bond length 2.44 angstrom). The Tc-Tc distances are indicative of double bonded Tc atoms. Tc3Cl9 is isostructural to its rhenium homologue, trirhenium nonachloride.

β-TcCl3 is obtained by the reaction between technetium metal and chlorine gas. Its structure consists of infinite layers of edge-sharing octahedra, similar to MoCl3 and ReCl3, with distances that also indicate metal-metal bonding. It is less stable than α-TcCl3 and slowly transforms into it.

References 

Technetium compounds
Metal halides
Chlorides